Nedra Talley, now known as Nedra Talley-Ross (born January 27, 1946), is a retired American singer. She is best known as a former member of the girl group the Ronettes, in which she performed with her cousins Ronnie and Estelle Bennett. As of 2022, Talley is the last surviving member of the group.

Career 
In 1967, Talley and Estelle Bennett left the Ronettes, a decade after the group's formation. The split was reportedly due in part to interference from the group's producer Phil Spector, who later married Ronnie Bennett. Talley said that when she met Scott Ross, her future husband, she became a born-again Christian. Talley also decided to leave the Ronettes because she felt there was little place for Christian-inspired music.

In 1977, Talley recorded several Christian songs written by her church's music director, Ted Sandquist. These were released on the album The Courts of the King: The Worship Music of Ted Sandquist. One of the cuts, a medley, "Love of My Lord" / "Redwood Tree" was released as a 45 promo single. Guitarist Phil Keaggy played on at least two of the album cuts with her. For its 30th anniversary, this album was finally released on CD.

In 1978, Talley recorded Full Circle, a solo contemporary Christian music album, on which Keaggy once again musically backed her. Keaggy wrote the title track and released his own version of it on his 1981 album Town To Town. The album was produced by Talley's husband, Ross. The album's inner sleeve featured Talley's bio (and salvation story), but also a photo taken in the mid-'60s aboard a plane with Talley and fellow Ronette, Estelle Bennett, sharing seats with The Beatles' John Lennon and George Harrison, who were great fans of the Ronettes. The album has to date, never been re-released.

A four-disc set, Roger McGuinn's The Folk Den Project (1995–2005), featured the old folk song, "Follow the Drinking Gourd", as sung by McGuinn with Talley providing the sole but prominent background vocal.

In 2007, the Ronettes were inducted into the Rock and Roll Hall of Fame.

Personal life 
Talley is of African American, Native American and Puerto Rican descent.  She is married to Scott Ross, a former DJ turned interviewer for The 700 Club on the Christian Broadcasting Network. They have four children. As of 2007, she was a businesswoman working in real estate. She lives with her husband in Virginia Beach, Virginia.

See also

List of Puerto Ricans

References

1946 births
Living people
20th-century American singers
21st-century American singers
20th-century African-American women singers
American people who self-identify as being of Native American descent
Singers from New York City
American people of Puerto Rican descent
The Ronettes members
Native American singers
20th-century American women singers
21st-century American women singers
21st-century African-American women singers